Mwanahawa Abdul Juma (born 4 November 1985 ) better known by her stage name Queen Darleen is a Tanzanian singer signed under WCB Wasafi.

Biography

Early life
Born as on born 4 November 1985 in Kigoma Region as Mwanahawa Abdul Juma, Darleen is a daughter of Abdul Juma Issack (father) and a  sister to tanzanian singer Diamond Platnumz. Darleen is a Muslim by religion.

Personal life
Darleen was alleged dating fellow Tanzanian singer Ali Kiba, a speculation that she and Ali Kiba publicly denied revealing that they were just friends and business partners.

At the end of 2019, Darleen was married to Isihaka Mtoro as the second wife, a fact that surfaced the internet on the coming days. Mtoro and Darleen were separated in 2022.

Darleen has two children, a son whom she never shared publicly until 2022 also a daughter she had with Isihaka Mtoro.

Music career
Darleen started her music career in the early 2000s as an independ artist featured in Dully Sykes' songs "Historia Ya Kweli" and "Sharifa" also "Mtoto wa Geti Kali" a song by Inspector Haroun.

Darleen released her first debut song as a proffesional singer "Wajua" featuring Ali Kiba in 2006 whom she addressed not to collaborate with, after a rumor that she slept with him also Ali Kiba's long rivalry with her brother Diamond Platnumz. She released her first song "Maneno Maneno" in 2011 that won her her the first award of her career at the 2012 Tanzania Music Awards for the best Ragga/Dancehall song.

WCB Wasafi
Darleen was signed to WCB Wasafi music label, a label owned by her step brother, Diamond Platnumz in 2017. She released her first song as an official WCB Wasafi artist "Kijuso" on February 17, 2017 featuring Rayvanny, followed by couple of hitsongs; "Ntakufilisi", "Touch" and WCB's joint song "Zilipedwa" released on August 25, 2017. She is nicknamed "Wasafi's first lady" as she was the first female artist to be signed under WCB Wasafi.

Awards and nominations
2012 Tanzania Music Awards

|-
|rowspan=1|2012 
|Maneno Maneno ft Dully Sykes
|Best Ragga/Dancehall song
|
|}

Discography
2012
Maneno Maneno
2017
Zilipendwa (with Mbosso, Diamond Platnumz, Harmonize, Rich Mavoko, Lava Lava & Rayvanny)
Ntakufilisi
Kijuso ft Rayvanny
2019
Mbali ft Harmonize
Muhogo
Tawire
2020
Quarantine (with Diamond Platnumz, Zuchu, Lava Lava, Mbosso and Rayvanny)
Bachel ft Lava Lava

References

External links
Official website

1985 births
Living people
Tanzanian women rappers
People from Kigoma Region
21st-century Tanzanian women singers
Swahili-language singers
Tanzanian musicians
Tanzanian Bongo Flava musicians